Late Extra is a 1935 British crime film directed by Albert Parker and starring James Mason (his film debut), Virginia Cherrill, and Alastair Sim.

It was made at Wembley Studios by the British subsidiary of the Fox Film Company as a quota quickie.  The film's sets were designed by the art director Ralph W. Brinton.

Cast

References

Bibliography
 Chibnall, Steve. Quota Quickies: The Birth of the British 'B' Film. British Film Institute, 2007.
 Low, Rachael. Filmmaking in 1930s Britain. George Allen & Unwin, 1985.
 Wood, Linda. British Films, 1927-1939. British Film Institute, 1986.

External links

1935 films
1935 crime films
British crime films
Films directed by Albert Parker
Films set in London
Films shot at Wembley Studios
20th Century Fox films
British black-and-white films
1930s English-language films
1930s British films
Quota quickies